Thomas Seward (died c. 1406), of Shaftesbury, Dorset, was an English Member of Parliament and merchant.

Seward was married with one daughter.

He was a Member (MP) of the Parliament of England for Shaftesbury in February 1383 and February 1388.

References

14th-century births
1406 deaths
English MPs February 1383
People from Shaftesbury
English MPs February 1388